Torquay United Football Club is an English professional association football club based in Torquay, Devon.  This is a chronological list of all Torquay United managers from 1921 until the current season.

History
When the second incarnation of Torquay United was formed by the merger of Torquay Town and Babbacombe in 1921, Torquay Town striker Crad Evans was installed as the club's first player-manager.  After three seasons at Plainmoor, he was succeeded by Harry Raymond before Percy Mackrill took over the reins in 1925.  Under Mackrill, United won the Southern League Western Section in 1927 and were elected to the Football League later that same year.  Despite requiring re-election after the club's first League season, Torquay managed to establish a place in the Third Division South, albeit without ever finishing any higher than 10th position in all the seasons leading up to World War II.  The club's most successful pre-War manager was Frank Brown who achieved three top 10 finishes in six seasons until 1938.  After the War, Johnny McNeil brought greater success to the club and had led Torquay to second place in the Third Division South before suddenly leaving in March 1950.  Unable to maintain the momentum following McNeil's departure, United eventually had to settle for a 5th-place finish.

Torquay's longest serving manager, Eric Webber, joined the club in October 1951 and remained in charge for nearly fourteen years.  During this period, Torquay achieved their best ever finish to a season after narrowly missing out on promotion to the Second Division in 1957.  When the League was divided into four nationwide divisions, Webber oversaw Torquay's first ever promotion after finishing third in Division Four in 1960.  Torquay only lasted two seasons in Division Three and Webber eventually parted company with the club in 1965.  Webber's successor, Frank O'Farrell, achieved promotion back to Division Three in 1966 after only his first season in charge.  This marked the beginning of Torquay's most successful period to date, enjoying six consecutive seasons in the Third Division.  However, O'Farrell himself left the club in December 1968 to take over the manager's job at Leicester City before eventually becoming manager of Manchester United in the summer of 1971.

O'Farrell's departure triggered a slow decline in Torquay's fortunes.  His successor Allan Brown managed to keep Torquay in Division Three before being sacked in October 1971.  However, Brown's replacement, Jack Edwards, failed to maintain the club's Third Division status and they were relegated in 1972.  With Edwards unable to return Torquay to Division Three, the rest of the 1970s saw Malcolm Musgrove and then Mike Green preside over a period which was largely characterised by falling attendances and (at best) mid-table finishes.  This was despite Frank O'Farrell returning to take temporary charge of first team affairs before the appointment of Green in 1977.  O'Farrell would take over for one more season after Green's departure in 1981 while at the same time grooming his successor Bruce Rioch.  After Rioch left the club under unfortunate circumstances in 1984, things got even worse for Torquay with the arrival of David Webb, whose reign coincided with two rock bottom League finishes and a fire which destroyed part of the grandstand at Plainmoor.  Later preferring to concentrate on his role as the club's Managing Director, Webb eventually appointed Stuart Morgan as first-team manager in 1985.  Morgan was the man in charge in 1987 when a last minute equaliser against Crewe Alexandra on the final day of the season saved Torquay from relegation to the Football Conference.

Arriving in the summer of 1987, Cyril Knowles managed to revitalise Torquay United and led the club to the Division Four play-offs in 1988.  The following year, Knowles was responsible for Torquay's first ever Wembley appearance after reaching the  1989 Sherpa Van Trophy Final.  The former Tottenham man was also notable for introducing a young Lee Sharpe to the Torquay first-team, attracting the attention of Manchester United who were prepared to pay a club record £185,000 for the teenager in 1988.  Dave Smith replaced Knowles in 1989 and helped build the squad which eventually beat Blackpool in the 1991 Division Four play-off final, although John Impey was the man in charge for Torquay's second appearance at Wembley after Smith had left the club just weeks before the final. However, Impey would not survive as manager for long and Torquay were relegated after only one season in Division Three.

The next two decades would see a succession of managers experience a wide variety of fortunes at Plainmoor.  Yugoslavian Ivan Golac lasted barely a few months in 1992, while Paul Compton needed the experienced Neil Warnock to take over and save Torquay from the threat of relegation to the Conference in 1993.  Don O'Riordan performed well enough to get United to the 1994 Division Three play-offs before being sacked in 1995 with the club again in danger of losing its League status.  Kevin Hodges guided Torquay to another Wembley play-off final in 1998, but were second best to Colchester United on that occasion.  Just three years later, the club had to call upon the experience of ex-Torquay striker Colin Lee to replace Wes Saunders when the club were again veering perilously close to non-League football in 2001.  Nevertheless, by 2004 the club's fortunes had changed yet again with Leroy Rosenior becoming the first Torquay manager since Frank O'Farrell in 1966 to achieve automatic promotion.  However, Torquay would again only enjoy one season in the newly named League One, and by 2006, it was the turn of Ian Atkins to pull off the 'great escape' and keep United in the Football League.  While he was successful on that occasion, with turmoil on and off the pitch throughout the following season, neither Atkins nor Luboš Kubík nor Keith Curle could prevent Torquay from finally dropping out of League football in 2007.

The job of returning Torquay to the Football League was given to former United midfielder Paul Buckle.  Despite a largely successful first campaign in the Conference, United would lose in the play-off semi-finals to local rivals Exeter City, while a week later, a first appearance at the new Wembley Stadium would result in more disappointment with a defeat by Ebbsfleet United in the 2008 FA Trophy Final.  However, Torquay would make another return to Wembley the following season and were this time victorious after beating Cambridge United in the Conference play-off final, ensuring United's return to League Two after only a two-year absence.  In 2011, at the end of Paul Buckle's fourth season in charge, Torquay reached the League Two play-off final at Old Trafford but were beaten by Stevenage.  Immediately after the defeat, Buckle accepted an offer to become the new Bristol Rovers manager which led to the appointment of the current Torquay manager, former Leyton Orient and Cambridge boss, Martin Ling.  With Ling currently on long-term sick leave, after Alan Knill successfully kept Torquay afloat, Martin Ling was sacked immediately and Knill was appointed permanently 2 weeks later.

Managers
Statistics include all first team competitive matches from 1921 until 27 August 2022.It does not include statistics for any Wartime Leagues or county tournaments such as the Devon Senior Cup or Devon Bowl.

Notes

A.  Drawn matches decided by penalty shoot-outs are counted as draws.
B.  Win% is rounded to two decimal places.
C.  Although Albert Hoskins was announced in the press as Percy Mackrill's successor, he never actually took charge of the team.  Frank Womack was the man in charge from the beginning of the 1929–30 season. 
D.  Steward also took charge of the three drawn games of the 1939–40 season which were played before the outbreak of World War II forced the abandonment of the Football League as well as the entire 1939–40 Wartime League South Western Division season (P28 W14 D6 L8).  These matches do not count towards official records.
E.  Although Torquay had qualified for the Third Division South Cup Final, their opponents (either Queens Park Rangers or Port Vale) had yet to be decided. The final, which was scheduled for September 1939, was not played due to the outbreak of World War II and the tournament would never be contested again.
F.  Butler also took charge of the 1945–46 Wartime Third Division South season (P36 W11 D8 L17) which was played before the recommencement of the Football League in 1946.  These matches do not count towards official records.
G.  Despite Curle still officially being under contract until the end of June, Leroy Rosenior was announced as the next Torquay manager on 17 May 2007.  However, almost immediately after the announcement, the club was taken over with the new owners choosing not to install Rosenior as boss.
H.  Martin Ling's last game in charge before going on long-term sick leave.

References
General

Specific

External links

Managers
 
Torquay United